Menukin (also Romanized as Menūkīn; also known as Manūkī, Nanook, Nānu, and Nanūk) is a village in Rabor Rural District, in the Central District of Rabor County, Kerman Province, Iran. At the 2006 census, its population was 34, in 10 families.

References 

Populated places in Rabor County